Scott Petersen (born July 4, 1970) is an American professional golfer.

Career
Petersen was born in Williston, North Dakota. He played college golf at the University of Tulsa and the University of Colorado. At Colorado, he was an All-American his senior year. Petersen turned professional in 1993.

Between 1996 and 2007, Petersen played on the Nationwide Tour (1996, 2000–07) and the Canadian Tour (1997–99). He won twice on the Canadian Tour and once on the Nationwide Tour.

Professional wins (6)

Buy.com Tour wins (1)

Canadian Tour wins (2)
1997 Infiniti Championship
1999 Samsung Canadian PGA Championship

Other wins (3)
1991 Colorado Stroke Play Championship
1993 Colorado Stroke Play Championship
2000 Colorado Open

References

External links

American male golfers
PGA Tour golfers
Colorado Buffaloes men's golfers
Tulsa Golden Hurricane men's golfers
Golfers from North Dakota
Golfers from Colorado
University of Tulsa alumni
People from Williston, North Dakota
People from Parker, Colorado
1970 births
Living people